Diancistrus is a genus of viviparous brotulas.

Species
There are currently 28 recognized species in this genus:
 Diancistrus alatus Schwarzhans, Møller & J. G. Nielsen, 2005 (Winged coralbrotula)
 Diancistrus alleni Schwarzhans, Møller & J. G. Nielsen, 2005 (Allen's coralbrotula)
 Diancistrus altidorsalis Schwarzhans, Møller & J. G. Nielsen, 2005 (Humpbacked coralbrotula)
 Diancistrus atollorum Schwarzhans, Møller & J. G. Nielsen, 2005 (Atoll coralbrotula)
 Diancistrus beateae Schwarzhans, Møller & J. G. Nielsen, 2005 (Beate's coralbrotula)
 Diancistrus brevirostris Schwarzhans, Møller & J. G. Nielsen, 2005 (Shortnosed coralbrotula)
 Diancistrus eremitus Schwarzhans, Møller & J. G. Nielsen, 2005 (Lonely coralbrotula)
 Diancistrus erythraeus (Fowler, 1946)
 Diancistrus fijiensis Schwarzhans, Møller & J. G. Nielsen, 2005 (Fiji coralbrotula)
 Diancistrus fuscus (Fowler, 1946) (Dusky brotulid)
 Diancistrus jackrandalli Schwarzhans, Møller & J. G. Nielsen, 2005 (Randall's coralbrotula)
 Diancistrus jeffjohnsoni Schwarzhans, Møller & J. G. Nielsen, 2005 (Johnson's coralbrotula)
 Diancistrus karinae Schwarzhans, Møller & J. G. Nielsen, 2005 (Karin's coralbrotula)
 Diancistrus katrineae Schwarzhans, Møller & J. G. Nielsen, 2005 (Katrine's coralbrotula)
 Diancistrus leisi Schwarzhans, Møller & J. G. Nielsen, 2005 (Leis' coralbrotula)
 Diancistrus longifilis Ogilby, 1899 (Twinhook cusk)
 Diancistrus machidai Schwarzhans, Møller & J. G. Nielsen, 2005 (Machida's coralbrotula)
 Diancistrus manciporus Schwarzhans, Møller & J. G. Nielsen, 2005 (Few-pored coralbrotula)
 Diancistrus mcgroutheri Schwarzhans, Møller & J. G. Nielsen, 2005 (McGrouther's coralbrotula)
 Diancistrus mennei Schwarzhans, Møller & J. G. Nielsen, 2005 (Menne's coralbrotula)
 Diancistrus niger Schwarzhans, Møller & J. G. Nielsen, 2005 (Dark coralbrotula)
 Diancistrus novaeguineae (Machida, 1996)
 Diancistrus pohnpeiensis Schwarzhans, Møller & J. G. Nielsen, 2005 (Pohnpei coralbrotula)
 Diancistrus robustus Schwarzhans, Møller & J. G. Nielsen, 2005 (Robust coralbrotula)
 Diancistrus springeri Schwarzhans, Møller & J. G. Nielsen, 2005 (Springer's coralbrotula)
 Diancistrus tongaensis Schwarzhans, Møller & J. G. Nielsen, 2005 (Tonga coralbrotula)
 Diancistrus typhlops J. G. Nielsen, Schwarzhans & Hadiaty, 2009 (Blind cave coralbrotula)
 Diancistrus vietnamensis Schwarzhans, Møller & J. G. Nielsen, 2005 (Vietnam coralbrotula)

References

Bythitidae